The Shearwater Aviation Museum is an aviation museum located at CFB Shearwater in Shearwater, Nova Scotia. The museum acquires, conserves, organizes, researches and interprets to Canadian Forces personnel and the public at large for their study, education and enjoyment, artifacts and documents which exemplify the history of Canadian maritime military aviation.

History
The museum was founded in 1978 and was originally located a single floor of a barrack block. However, in August 1995 the museum reopened in a former gymnasium on the base. The museum was expanded in August 2001, with the opening of a new addition.

Exhibits
A number of permanent exhibits are featured at the museum with maritime aviation and naval history being a key theme. Included is an exhibit about HMCS Bonaventure, Canada's last aircraft carrier. The exhibit includes a reconstruction of the briefing room aboard the aircraft carrier, complete with original seats. Also on display is a replica of the map wall used by the RCAF Eastern Air Command to coordinate the Battle of the Atlantic.

Aircraft on display

 Canadair CT-114 Tutor 114075
 Canadair CT-133 Silver Star 133038
 Canadair CT-133 Silver Star 133618
 de Havilland Canada CP-121 Tracker 1557
 Fairey Firefly FR.I PP462
 Fairey Swordfish IV HS469
 General Motors AS.3 Avenger 85861
 Grumman CP-121 Tracker 1501
 McDonnell CF-101B Voodoo 101063
 McDonnell F2H-3 Banshee 126402
 North American Harvard IIA 2777
 Piasecki H-25
 Sikorsky HO4S-3 55885

See also
 National Naval Aviation Museum

References

External links
 Shearwater Aviation Museum
 Shearwater Aviation Museum Foundation

Aerospace museums in Nova Scotia
Museums in Halifax, Nova Scotia
Naval museums in Canada